The Soviet Union's 1981 nuclear test series was a group of 21 nuclear tests conducted in 1981. These tests  followed the 1980 Soviet nuclear tests series and preceded the 1982 Soviet nuclear tests series.

References

1981
1981 in the Soviet Union
1981 in military history
Explosions in 1981